A colored pencil (American English), coloured pencil (Commonwealth English), pencil crayon, or coloured/colouring lead (Canadian English, Newfoundland English) is an art medium constructed of a narrow, pigmented core encased in a wooden cylindrical case. Unlike graphite and charcoal pencils, colored pencils' cores are wax- or oil-based and contain varying proportions of pigments, additives, and binding agents. Water-soluble (watercolor) pencils and pastel pencils are also manufactured as well as colored cores for mechanical pencils.

Colored pencils are made in a wide range of price, quality and usability, from student-grade to professional-grade. Concentration of pigments in the core, lightfastness of the pigments, durability of the colored pencil, and softness of the core are some determinants of a brand's quality and, consequently, its market price. There is no general quality difference between wax/oil-based and water-soluble colored pencils, although some manufacturers rate their water-soluble pencils as less lightfast than their similar wax/oil-based pencils.
The rising popularity of colored pencils as an art medium sparked the beginning of the Colored Pencil Society of America (CPSA). According to its website, “[CPSA] was founded in 1990 as a nonprofit organization dedicated to artists over 18 years of age working with colored pencil”. The CPSA not only promotes colored pencil art as fine art, but also strives to set lightfastness standards for colored pencil manufacturers. Other countries such as the United Kingdom, United States, Canada, Australia and Mexico – among many others – have formed their own organizations and societies for colored pencil artists. Colored pencils are commonly stored in pencil cases to prevent damage.

Despite colored pencils' existence for more than a century, the art world has historically treated the medium with less admiration (and even disdain) compared to other art mediums. However, the discovery of new techniques and methods, the development of lightfast pencils, and the formation of authoritative organizations is better enabling colored pencils to compete with other mediums. Additionally, colored pencils are more affordable, cleaner, and simpler compared to other mediums.

History 
The use of wax-based media in crayons can be traced back to the Greek Golden Age, and was later documented by Roman scholar, Pliny the Elder. Wax-based materials have appealed to artists for centuries due to their resistance to decay, the vividness and brilliance of their colors, and their unique rendering qualities.

Although colored pencils had been used for “checking and marking” for decades prior, it was not until the early 20th century that artist-quality colored pencils were produced. Manufacturers that began producing artist-grade colored pencils included Faber-Castell in 1908 (the Polychromos range was initially 60 colors) and Caran d’Ache in 1924, followed by Berol Prismacolor in 1938.  Other notable manufacturers include Bruynzeel-Sakura, Cretacolor, Derwent, Koh-i-Noor Hardtmuth, Mitsubishi (uni-ball), Schwan-Stabilo, and Staedtler.

Types 
Several types of colored pencils are manufactured for both artistic and practical uses.

Artist- and professional-grade 

Artist and professional-grade pencils are made with higher concentrations of high-quality pigments than student-grade colored pencils. Their lightfastness – resistance to UV rays in sunlight – is also measured and documented. Core durability, break and water resistance, and brand popularity are also notable features of artist-grade colored pencils. Artist-grade pencils have the largest color ranges; 72 color sets are very common and there are several brands of 120 colors or more. They are also typically available as individual pencils.

Student- and scholastic-grade 

Many of the same companies that produce artist-grade colored pencils also offer student-grade materials and scholastic-level colored pencils. Lightfastness rating is usually not included in student- and scholastic-grade colored pencils. Core composition and pigment-binder ratio vary among artist- and student-grade colored pencils even when the same company produces them. As they are intended for different users, student- and scholastic-grade colored pencils lack the high quality pigments and lightfastness standards that hold artist-grade products true to their name. Also their color range is smaller, often limited to 24 or 36 colors.

Using lower grade colored pencils does have its advantages, however. Some companies offer erasable colored pencils for beginning artists to experiment with. Also, due to their significantly lower prices, student-grade colored pencils are ideal for elementary and middle school students. Colored pencil manufactures tailor their products — and prices — to different age and skill groups.

Watercolor pencils 

Watercolor pencils, otherwise known as water-soluble pencils, are a versatile art medium. The pencils can be used dry—like normal colored pencils—or they can be applied wet to get the desired watercolor effect. In wet application, the artist first lays down the dry pigment and then follows up with a damp paintbrush to intensify and spread the colors. This technique can also be used to blend colors together, and many artists will apply both techniques in one art piece. Artist-grade watercolor pencils typically come in 60 or 72 colors but can go up all the way up to 120 colors.

Oil based coloured pencil 
oil-based pencils utilize an oil-based binder

Pastel pencils 

Pastel pencils are similar to hard pastels. Pastel pencils can be used on their own or in combination with other mediums. They can be used dry, wet or blended together. Many artists use them for preliminary sketches, given that graphite pencils aren't compatible with pastels. They can also be sharpened to a fine point to add details on pastel drawings.

Techniques 

Colored pencils can be used in combination with several other drawing mediums. When used by themselves, there are two main rendering techniques colored pencil artists use.

Layering is usually used in the beginning stages of a colored pencil drawing, but can also be used for entire pieces. In layering, tones are gradually built up using several layers of primary colors. Layered drawings usually expose the tooth of the paper and are characterized by a grainy, fuzzy finish.
Burnishing is a blending technique in which a colorless blender or a light-colored pencil is applied firmly to an already layered drawing. This produces a shiny surface of blended colors that gets deep into the grain of the paper.
Roughening is a technique, which creates a rendering of textured surfaces by placing a rough piece of paper underneath the drawing paper. Next, rub the drawing paper with a very smooth object to leave indentions on the paper. Finally, draw over it using colored pencil and the design should stand out.
Scoring patterns can be used to create highlights on objects. The technique requires tracing or transparent paper and a sharp pen. First, place the paper over the area being impressed. Then, with moderate pressure, the desired line or pattern is used.
Fusing colors encourages the colored pencil pigments to be physically blended using solvents, colorless blender, or a combination of both of these. This technique enables the colors to easily mix into a single color.

See also 

Blue pencil (editing)
List of arts media
List of pen types, brands and companies

References

External links
 

Pencils
Visual arts materials